The phrase Art In Bloom is often used as the title of various exhibits held annually, usually in spring, in art museums. The phrase was created by a Museum of Fine Arts, Boston, volunteer, Lorraine M. Pitts who also helped found the Danforth Museum in Framingham, MA. The exhibit is composed of traditional visual art pieces and corresponding flower arrangements done by local professional florists and garden club members. 

The original exhibit was held in the Museum of Fine Arts in Boston in 1976, where it is held annually; other institutions hosting such displays include the Minneapolis Institute of Arts, the Art Gallery of Greater Victoria, the North Carolina Museum of Art, and the Saint Louis Art Museum in St. Louis, Missouri. Universities such as the University of Missouri's Museum of Art and Archaeology in Columbia, Missouri also hold "Art in Bloom" exhibitions.

External links

 Museum of Fine Arts, Boston – Art in Bloom 2007
 Minneapolis Institute of Arts – Art in Bloom 2007
 Art Gallery of Greater Victoria - Art in Bloom 2007
 St. Louis Art Museum – Art in Bloom 2007
 University of Missouri–Columbia Museum of Art and Archaeology – Art in Bloom 2007
 Art In Bloom Show & Sale 2009 - Hamilton, Ontario, Canada

Visual arts exhibitions
Botanical art
Flower shows
Spring festivals